Sodium-dependent neutral amino acid transporter B(0)AT1 is a protein that in humans is encoded by the SLC6A19 gene.

Function 

SLC6A19 is a system B(0) transporter that mediates epithelial resorption of neutral amino acids across the apical membrane in the kidney and intestine.

Clinical significance 

Mutations in the SLC6A19 gene cause Hartnup disease.

References

Further reading 

Solute carrier family